Dayavittu Gamanisi is a 2017 Indian Kannada-language satirical film written, directed by Rohit Padaki, making his debut in direction. Krishna Sarthak is the main producer. It stars an ensemble cast including Raghu Mukherjee, Samyukta Hornad, Sukrutha Wagle, Vasishta N. Simha, Prakash Belawadi, Rajesh Nataranga, Bhavana Rao, Sangeetha Bhat. The film score and soundtrack for the film are composed by Anoop Seelin, and the cinematography was handled by Aravind Kashyap. It was nominated for the Filmfare Award for Best Film – Kannada at the 65th Filmfare Awards South.

Plot
Four stories making a drama

Cast
 Raghu Mukherjee
 Vasishta N. Simha
 Shatasharman S Avinash
 Sukrutha Wagle as Nandini
 Samyukta Hornad
 Bhavana Rao
 Rajesh Nataranga
 Poornachandra Mysore
 Sangeetha Bhat
 Prakash Belawadi
 Shilpa Ravi
 Chandan Achar
 Ashwin Hassan

Soundtrack

The film's score and soundtrack was composed by Anoop Seelin. The music rights were acquired by JP Music.

Awards and nominations

References

External links
 
 

2017 films
2010s Kannada-language films
2017 romantic drama films
Indian satirical films
Indian romantic drama films
2017 directorial debut films
Films scored by Anoop Seelin